The slaty-headed longbill or grey-winged longbill (Toxorhamphus poliopterus) is a species of bird in the family Melanocharitidae.
It is found in New Guinea.
Its natural habitats are subtropical or tropical moist lowland forest and subtropical or tropical moist montane forest.

References

slaty-headed longbill
Birds of New Guinea
slaty-headed longbill
Taxonomy articles created by Polbot